Out FM is an anti-racist, progressive LGBTQ public affairs and culture talk radio show airing on Tuesday evenings from 9 pm to 10 pm on WBAI 99.5 fm, Pacifica Radio in New York City. Founded in 1982 (as The Gay Show) the Encyclopedia of Lesbian, Gay, Bisexual, and Transgender History called it "one of the oldest and longest-running queer programs in the United States.

Guests have included intellectuals such as Urvashi Vaid and Dean Spade, political figures such as Larry Kramer and Rosie Mendez, and artists such as Jim Brochu and Jewelle Gomez.

See also
 LGBT culture in New York City

External links
Out FM Site
Out FM Facebook Page
Out FM Twitter

References

Anti-racism in the United States
LGBT-related radio programs
LGBT-related mass media in the United States
Pacifica Foundation programs
LGBT culture in New York City
American talk radio programs
Progressive talk radio
1980s LGBT-related mass media
1982 establishments in New York City